The 2000 Trophée des Champions was a football match held at Stade Auguste Bonal, Montbéliard on 22 July 2000, that saw 1999–2000 Division 1 champions AS Monaco FC defeat 2000 Coupe de France winners FC Nantes 6-5 on penalty kicks after a draw of 0–0.

Match details

See also
2000–01 French Division 1

2000–01 in French football
2000
AS Monaco FC matches
FC Nantes matches
Association football penalty shoot-outs
July 2000 sports events in France
Sport in Doubs